Astilodes is a monotypic genus of  jumping spiders containing the single species, Astilodes mariae. It was first described by Marek Michał Żabka in 2009, and is only found in Queensland.

References

Monotypic Salticidae genera
Salticidae
Spiders of Australia